TTNG (formerly known as This Town Needs Guns) are a British math rock band from Oxford, formed in 2003, and currently signed to the American label Sargent House Records. Following numerous departures, the band went from being a four-piece to a trio, featuring Henry Tremain on bass and lead vocals, Tim Collis on guitar and his brother Chris Collis on drums. Their debut full-length album, Animals, was released in the UK via Big Scary Monsters Recording Company in October of 2008 and shortly after in the US via Sargent House Records. They have released four studio albums, as well as numerous EPs and singles.

History
The band formed in 2003 in Oxford. The original lineup consisted of Stuart Smith on rhythm guitar and vocals, Tim Collis on lead guitar, Simon Thompson on drums and Ian Lewis on bass. Thompson and Lewis left the band in 2005, to be replaced by Dan Adams on bass (replaced by Jamie Cooper after the recording of Animals in 2008) and Matt Bennington on drums (replaced by Chris Collis, brother of guitarist Tim, in 2006). In their earlier careers, bassist Jamie Cooper had worked as a graphic designer, drummer Chris Collis had been a librarian at the University of Oxford, guitarist Tim Collis was a primary school teacher, and lead vocalist Stuart Smith worked building websites for a publisher. On 11 May 2011, it was announced on This Town Needs Guns' website that lead singer Stuart Smith would be leaving the band to start a family, and that he would be replaced by Pennines' singer and guitarist Henry Tremain. Bassist Jamie Cooper also left the band in late 2011 to focus on a career in graphic design. Tremain has since taken over on bass guitar duties, converting the band into a power trio.

On 14 September 2012, the first track from the second album 13.0.0.0.0, entitled "Cat Fantastic" was released on digital streaming platforms. The album was released on 22 January 2013.

Their third album, Disappointment Island, was released in July 2016.

In 2017, the whole band was arrested in Hong Kong during an immigration raid on the final show of their tour.

In July 2018, the band announced a 10-year anniversary tour of Animals, in which Smith would be returning to the band to play with them for the first time in seven years. In October of that year, an acoustic version of the album entitled Animals Acoustic  was released.

Musical style and influences 
Over the years, the band's musical style has progressed and changed, although the consistent focal point of their style has been the guitar work of Tim Collis interspersed with, at points, highly complex drumming and sparse, melodic bass. Early releases, however, featured more distorted chord progressions, as well as a strong focus on the interlinking melodies of both Collis and Smith's guitars. The Sydney Morning Herald describes the band's music as having "intricate pop guitar work, with a touch of jazz and Spanish influences". 

The band cites influences of other bands such as Owls, American Football and Make Believe.

Name change 
With the release of 13.0.0.0.0 the band announced that they would be calling themselves TTNG. They stated that the name was ironic because guns are hardly present in their hometown of Oxford, and the UK in general. As the band became more known around the world, the name was no longer clearly ironic. The band also felt uncomfortable with their name due to the issues of gun violence and mass shootings worldwide and in particular the United States and wanted to distance themselves from those associations

Discography

Albums
 Animals (BSM - October 2008, Sargent House - January 2009)
 13.0.0.0.0 (Sargent House - January 2013)
 Disappointment Island (Sargent House - July 2016)
 Animals Acoustic (Sargent House - October 2018)

EPs
 First Demo (2003)
 Split CD with Cats and Cats and Cats (Big Scary Monsters - 2007)
 This Town Needs Guns (Yellow Ghost - 2008, Rallye - 2008)

Singles
 "Hippy Jam Fest" (Big Scary Monsters - 2006)
 "And I'll Tell You For Why..." (Big Scary Monsters - 2007)
 "Pig" (Single Split with Pennines) (Big Scary Monsters - 2008)
 "Adventure, Stamina & Anger" (Sargent House - 2011)

Personnel

Current members
 Tim Collis - guitar (2003–present)
 Chris Collis - drums, percussion (2006–present)
 Henry Tremain - vocals (2011-present), bass (2013–present), guitar (2011-2012)

Former members
 Simon Thompson - drums (2003-2005)
 Ian Lewis - bass (2003-2005)
 Matt Bennington - drums (2005-2006)
 Stuart Smith - vocals, guitar (2003-2011, 2018-2019)
 Dan Adams - bass, trumpet (2005-2008)
 Jody Prewett - piano, guitar (2007-2008, contributed with additional guitars and piano on This Town Needs Guns)
 Jamie Cooper - bass, backing vocals (2008-2011)

Touring members
 Chris Baker (from the band Tyrone) - bass (2012)
 Henry Kohen (from the band Mylets) - bass (2016-2018)
 Garrett Karp - trumpet, piano, percussion (2018-2019)

Timeline

References

External links 
 

British indie rock groups
Math rock groups
Musical groups established in 2003
2003 establishments in England
Musical groups from Oxford
Sargent House artists